When Angels Sing is a short Christmas novel written by Turk Pipkin in 1999. It was adapted into a film named Angels Sing by Lionsgate in 2013 and was directed by Tim McCanlies.

Plot 

The story starts with Michael Walker who, when he was a boy at around Christmas, witnessed an accident where his brother David got killed trying to save him from sinking into the frozen water. Michael blames himself for it and loses his Christmas spirit. Years later he's married to Susan Walker, has a child named David after his brother and a daughter named Molly. David has always wanted a bicycle for Christmas. One day Michael sees a luxury house with everything that is needed for his family that is sold by Nick. Because The house would be sold soon Michael buys it much to the shock of Susan. When they move into the new neighbourhood they realize they there is a Christmas decorating competition held every year but Michael refuses. Also Nick usually dresses up as Santa Claus every Christmas until he sold his house to Michael.

One day around Christmas David, his grandpa (the Colonel) and grandma went to the Christmas tree sale and a car accident accord. The Colonel and David's grandma lay themselves over him resulting in killing them and David getting injured. After the incident David refuses to eat resulting in Michael getting more upset. He goes into his garage and at first out of anger take it out on the Christmas ornaments until he comes across the old family photos and decides to have an early start on the decoration competition. When he finishes Michael and his neighbours come together to sing It Came Upon the Midnight Clear under David's window with him listening. When they finished singing David says that he's hungry and wants something to eat. Close to Christmas Michael sees Nick outside his window and knows he couldn't stay away at Christmas.

In the end they celebrate Christmas and Michael gets a new fishing rod from the colonel and David asks if they could go fishing which Michael obliges to with tears in his eyes.

Characters 

 Michael Walker The protagonist of the story, father of David Walker and husband of Susan Walker.
 Susan Walker Michael Walker's wife.
 David Walker Michael Walker's son who gets involved in an accident resulting in him not eating.
 Molly Walker Michael Walker's daughter.
 Nick The owner of the luxury house that he sells to Michael's family and dresses up as Santa Claus every Christmas.
 Colonel Michael's father who gets killed in the accident involving grandma and David.

Christmas novels